Jonas Abrahamsen (born 20 September 1995) is a Norwegian professional road racing cyclist, who currently rides for UCI ProTeam .

Major results

2013
 7th Overall Giro della Lunigiana
2017
 10th Overall Grand Prix Priessnitz spa
 10th Sundvolden GP
2018
 6th Sundvolden GP
 9th Overall Tour du Loir-et-Cher
2019
 6th Sundvolden GP
2020
 Tour of Malopolska
1st Mountains classification
1st Stage 2

References

External links

1995 births
Living people
Norwegian male cyclists
Sportspeople from Skien